Northwest Township is one of ten townships in Orange County, Indiana, United States. As of the 2010 census, its population was 375 and it contained 199 housing units.

History
Northwest Township was named from its position in the northwestern corner of Orange County.

Geography

Unincorporated towns
 Bonds at 
 Hindostan at 
 Scarlet at 
(This list is based on USGS data and may include former settlements.)

Cemeteries
The township contains these three cemeteries: Faucett, Freeman and Miller.

Major highways
  U.S. Route 150

School districts
 Springs Valley Community School Corporation

Political districts
 Indiana's 9th congressional district
 State House District 62
 State Senate District 48

References
 
 United States Census Bureau 2008 TIGER/Line Shapefiles
 IndianaMap

External links
 Indiana Township Association
 United Township Association of Indiana
 City-Data.com page for Northwest Township

Townships in Orange County, Indiana
Townships in Indiana